Hayden pass may refer to several places:
 
Hayden Pass (Colorado)
Hayden Pass Fire, a 2016 wildfire
Hayden Mountain Summit (Oregon)